Mudurnu District is a district of the Bolu Province of Turkey. Its seat is the town of Mudurnu. Its area is 1,314 km2, and its population is 18,629 (2021).

Composition
There are two municipalities in Mudurnu District:
 Mudurnu
 Taşkesti

There are 70 villages in Mudurnu District:

 Akyokuş
 Alpagut
 Avdullar
 Bekdemirler
 Beyderesi
 Bostancılar
 Bulanık
 Çağşak
 Çamurluk
 Çamyurdu
 Çavuşderesi
 Çepni
 Çevreli
 Cuma
 Dağyolu
 Dedeler
 Delice
 Dereçetinören
 Dereköy
 Dodurga
 Dolayüz
 Ekinören
 Elmacıkdere
 Esenkaya
 Ferüz
 Fındıcak
 Gelinözü
 Gökören
 Gölcük
 Göllüören
 Göncek
 Gürçam
 Güveytepe
 Hacıhalimler
 Hacımusalar
 Hüsamettindere
 İğneciler
 Ilıca
 Kacık
 Karamurat
 Karapınarkavağı
 Karataş
 Karşıköy
 Kavallar
 Keçikıran
 Kilözü
 Kovucak
 Kurtlar
 Mangırlar
 Munduşlar
 Ordular
 Örencik
 Ormanpınarı
 Ortaköy
 Pelitözü
 Samat
 Samsaçavuş
 Sarıyar
 Sarpıncık
 Sırçalı
 Sürmeli
 Taşçılar
 Tavşansuyu
 Tımaraktaş
 Uğurlualan
 Uzunçam
 Vakıfaktaş
 Yaylabeli
 Yazılar
 Yeniceşeyhler

References

Districts of Bolu Province